Mendota is a U.S. city in Fresno County, California. The population was 11,014 at the 2010 U.S. Census. CA State Routes 180 and 33 run through the agricultural city.

Geography
It is located next to the San Joaquin River, near where the Delta-Mendota Canal intercepts it to bring extra water to the dry riverbed.

Climate
According to the Köppen Climate Classification system, Mendota has a semi-arid climate, abbreviated "BSk" on climate maps.

History
Beginning in 1891, Mendota thrived as a Southern Pacific Railroad storage and switching facility site. Southern Pacific management borrowed the name from Mendota, Illinois. The first post office opened in 1892. The city incorporated in 1942, and is mostly recognized for its immense production of cantaloupes. Consequently, the city of Mendota is identified as The Cantaloupe Center of the World. State water projects brought irrigation to the region, setting the stage for the tremendous growth of agriculture.

In 2007 a new Mendota Branch Library opened, part of the San Joaquin Valley Library System.

The city suffers from chronic unemployment averaging 20%. In 2009 a drought combined with a recession caused unemployment to surge above 40%. The unemployment was quoted at 45% in May 2011.

In 2019, USA Today named Mendota the "worst city in America" due to poverty, violent crime rate and high unemployment. However, some residents took issue with the ranking.

Demographics

2010
At the 2010 census Mendota had a population of 11,014. The racial makeup of Mendota was 5,823 White, 107 (1.0%) African American, 153 (1.4%) Native American, 82 (0.7%) Asian, 5 (0.0%) Pacific Islander, 4,465 (40.5%) from other races, and 379 (3.4%) from two or more races. Hispanic or Latino of any race were 10,643 persons (96.6%).

The whole population lived in households, no one lived in non-institutionalized group quarters and no one was institutionalized.

There were 2,424 households, 1,583 (65.3%) had children under the age of 18 living in them, 1,309 (54.0%) were opposite-sex married couples living together, 457 (18.9%) had a female householder with no husband present, 319 (13.2%) had a male householder with no wife present.  There were 303 (12.5%) unmarried opposite-sex partnerships, and 11 (0.5%) same-sex married couples or partnerships. 197 households (8.1%) were one person and 78 (3.2%) had someone living alone who was 65 or older. The average household size was 4.54.  There were 2,085 families (86.0% of households); the average family size was 4.49.

The age distribution was 3,731 people (33.9%) under the age of 18, 1,500 people (13.6%) aged 18 to 24, 3,432 people (31.2%) aged 25 to 44, 1,832 people (16.6%) aged 45 to 64, and 519 people (4.7%) who were 65 or older.  The median age was 26.2 years. For every 100 females, there were 123.6 males.  For every 100 females age 18 and over, there were 134.3 males.

There were 2,556 housing units at an average density of ,of which 2,424 were occupied, 1,056 (43.6%) by the owners and 1,368 (56.4%) by renters.  The homeowner vacancy rate was 1.9%; the rental vacancy rate was 4.1%.  5,075 people (46.1% of the population) lived in owner-occupied housing units and 5,939 people (53.9%) lived in rental housing units.

2000
At the 2000 census there were 7,890 people in 1,825 households, including 1,545 families, in the city.  The population density was 1,629.1/km (4,229.4/mi2).  There were 1,878 housing units at an average density of 387.8/km (1,006.7/mi2).  The racial makeup of the city was 27.33% White, 0.66% Black or African American, 1.31% Native American, 0.72% Asian, 0.16% Pacific Islander, 63.12% from other races, and 6.70% from two or more races.  94.65% of the population were Hispanic or Latino of any race.
Of the 1,825 households 53.4% had children under the age of 18 living with them, 56.8% were married couples living together, 16.9% had a female householder with no husband present, and 15.3% were non-families. 9.1% of households were one person and 3.9% were one person aged 65 or older.  The average household size was 4.32 and the average family size was 4.38.

The age distribution was 33.9% under the age of 18, 15.3% from 18 to 24, 30.9% from 25 to 44, 14.7% from 45 to 64, and 5.2% 65 or older.  The median age was 25 years. For every 100 females, there were 130.2 males.  For every 100 females age 18 and over, there were 142.0 males.

The median household income was $23,705 and the median family income  was $22,984. Males had a median income of $17,500 versus $21,319 for females. The per capita income for the city was $6,967.  About 35.2% of families and 41.9% of the population were below the poverty line, including 49.4% of those under age 18 and 16.6% of those age 65 or over.

Politics
Mendota has 1,827 registered voters, and has the lowest percentage of "decline to state" voters in California.  7.6% of voters are "decline to state" while 69.1% are registered Democrats and 17.9% are registered Republican.

Education
The Mendota Unified School District is the school district serving Mendota.

 Mendota High School
 Mendota Junior High School
 Washington Elementary School
 Mendota Elementary School
 McCabe Elementary School
 Mendota Alternative Education

Economy
Major employers in Mendota include Stamoules Produce, Oro Loma Ranch, Ruby Fresh, and Cardella Ranch and Winery.

Mendota has been known as "The Cantaloupe Center of the World." In 2021, climate change-related drought and high temperatures slowed both cantaloupe production and local population growth.

Federal Correctional Institution, Mendota 
A prominent water tower marks the location. Completion was scheduled for 2010, but the facility opened in 2012 after several years of funding delays. The facility plan includes a medium security section, housing up to 1,152 adults, and a minimum security satellite camp with a capacity of 128, supervised by a full-time staff of 300 to 350.

Mendota Wildlife Area

In 1956, the State of California purchased  6,100 acres of waterfowl wintering habitat along the San Joaquin River and established the Mendota Wildlife Area.

References

External links

Information about Federal Correctional Institution, Mendota.

Incorporated cities and towns in California
Cities in Fresno County, California
Populated places established in 1891
San Joaquin Valley
1891 establishments in California